Zamunda is a genus of crickets in the subfamily Podoscirtinae and tribe Aphonoidini.  Species have been found in southern China and peninsular Malaysia (known distribution may be incomplete).

Species 
Zamunda includes the following species:
 Zamunda fuscirostris (Chopard, 1969) – type species  (as Aphonoides fuscirostris Chopard)
 Zamunda humeralis Gorochov, 2007

References

External links
 

Ensifera genera
Crickets
Orthoptera of Asia